The  is a Chinese plucked string instrument. In ancient China, the term  came to refer to three different musical instruments: a zither and two different types of harp. 

However, it should be remembered that during the Tang dynasty, the term was also used as a general term to describe string instruments from the other countries that played in the Chinese court. It may not have meant a specific type of instrument at that time.

History
There were three types of variations of the  name, and scholars have been working to match them to musical instruments. The variations are wo konghou, shu konghou and feng shou konghou.

Wo konghou

One use of wo konghou could have been applied to a fretted bridge zither whose strings were plucked with a slender bamboo stick). The other possibility for the wo-konghou is as an angular harp turned on its side to function as a horizontal harp.

Zither
The zither form was first mentioned in written texts in the Spring and Autumn period (770–476 BC). It is one of the oldest Chinese musical instruments, similar to the Korean geomungo. The  was used to play  (court music) in the Kingdom of Chu. This instrument seems to have been no longer used, but recently China has been reviving the wo-konghou and bringing it into the traditional orchestra.

Horizontal harp
In 1996, horizontal angular harps from the 5th century B.C. were found in Zagunluq village, Qiemo county, Xinjiang autonomous region, China. The harps bear close resemblance to harps from Pazyryk, Assyria and Olbia. Archeological finds show details of construction; for instance, the soundboxes were carved from diversiform-leaved poplar. The finds are evidence of contact between Xinjiang and Altai, Assyria and the Black Sea region. The finds show a pre-Han Dynasty konghou, that may date as far back as 1000 B.C.: that date is speculative and needs more evidence.

Shu konghou
The  or vertical  first appeared in the Eastern Han Dynasty (25–220 AD). It can be divided into big and small varieties. It was generally played in rites and ceremonies and gradually increased in popularity among the ordinary people.

Feng shou konghou

The feng shou konghou (literally "phoenix-headed konghou"), an arched harp, was introduced from India in the Eastern Jin Dynasty (317–420 AD). The instrument became extinct sometime in the Ming Dynasty.

Modern 

The modern  appeared in the 20th century and is different from the ancient . Its shape is similar to Western concert harps.

Modern concert konghous may be contrasted from the Western concert harps by looking at the strings, which are folded over on the konghou to make two rows. This allows players the use of "advanced playing techniques", including vibrato, bending tones and overtones. Paired strings on opposite sides of the instrument are tuned to the same note. They start from a tuning peg and travel over two bridges on opposite sides of the instrument, down through the playing area and are then fixed at the far end to opposite sides of a freely moving lever. Depressing the lever changes the pitch in one of the strings in the pair, raising the pitch of the other. The two rows of strings also make it easier to play swift rhythms.

In other places

Korea

In Korea, like China, the names for the harps started as terms for nonspecific foreign stringed instruments. The konghou was adopted in Korea, where it was called gonghu (hangul: 공후; hanja: 箜篌), but its use died out (although it has been revived by some South Korean musicians in the early 21st century). There were three subtypes according to shape:
Sogonghu (hangul: 소공후; hanja: 小箜篌; literally "small harp")photo The sogonhu was a vertical angular harp, one small enough to be carried in the musicians hands while playing.

Sugonghu (hangul: 수공후; hanja: 豎箜篌; literally "vertical harp")photo This is the same harp as the shu konghou and looks like vertical harps from ancient Assyria.

Wagonghu (hangul: 와공후; hanja: 臥箜篌; literally "lying down harp") The wagonhu today is designated for arched harps that have the appearance of the arched harp from Myanmar, the saung.

Japan

In Japan, the wo-konghou (fretted zither) was called kudaragoto (百済琴 / くだらごと), and the shu-konghou (angular harp) was called kugo (箜篌 / くご). These instruments were in use in some Togaku (Tang music) performances during the Nara period, but seem to have died out by the 10th century. The kugo (angular harp) has been revived in Japan since the late 20th century, and the Japanese composer Mamoru Fujieda has composed for it. Tomoko Sugawara commissioned a playable kugo harp from builder Bill Campbell and earned an Independent Music Awards nomination for her 2010 album, Along the Silk Road, playing traditional and newly written works for the instrument.

Gallery

References

External links

Konghou photo. CUHK.edu
Page with ancient picture of Konghou.

Chinese musical instruments
Harps
Chinese words and phrases
Angular harps